Fellbach is a mid-sized town on the north-east edge of Stuttgart in Baden-Württemberg, Germany. With a population of approximately 45.430  is the second largest town in the District Rems-Murr-Kreis.

Fellbach was first mentioned as Velbach in 1121. It was called Vellebach in 1357 and the name Fehlbach was used in around 1800. On 14 October 1933, it was declared a city. After World War II it reached a population of more than 20,000 in 1950 and therefore received the status "Große Kreisstadt".

Fellbach has 3 main districts: Fellbach, Schmiden (since 1 January 1973) and Oeffingen (since 1 April 1974).

Geography

Geographical location
Fellbach is located south of the Neckar basin on a plateau between the Neckar and Rems valley at the northern foothills of the Schurwald. The highest points are the Kappelberg (Baden-Württemberg) (469.0 m) and the Kernen (hill) (513.2 m). The metropolitan area extends north into the so-called "Schmidener Feld".

Neighboring communities
The following cities and towns adjacent to the city of Fellbach. They are starting clockwise to the east: 
Waiblingen and Kernen im Remstal (both Rems-Murr-Kreis), Stuttgart (city district) and Remseck am Neckar (district of Ludwigsburg).

Constituent
The city Fellbach consists of the core city and the two districts Schmiden (incorporated on 1 January 1973 and Oeffingen (incorporatedon 1 April 1974).
In the field of Fellbach are five separate villages. For Fellbach owns the city Fellbach and the place Lindle. To Oeffingen includes the place Oeffingen and the homestead Tennhof and to Schmiden the place Schmiden. Furthermore, there are in the urban area Fellbach the dialed villages Erbach, Immenrot and Gretenbach.

History
Fellbach was first mentioned as "Velbach" in 1121. The name "Velebach" appeared in 1357 and "Fehlbach" in 1800. Several landlords had possessions in Fellbach, the House Württemberg bought piece by piece. First, the village belonged to Oberamt Cannstatt. After its dissolution in 1923 Fellbach came to Oberamt Waiblingen, this became in 1938 Waiblingen district. After Fellbach had grown to the largest Württemberg village, the community was named October 14, 1933 for city. After World War II, the population crossed the 20,000 threshold. Therefore, Fellbach was appointed on April 1, 1956 to the district town in the district of Waiblingen.

Schmiden was first mentioned in 1225 as "Smidheim". Schmiden first belonged to Oberamt Waiblingen and only came in 1718 to Oberamt Cannstatt. After its dissolution in 1923 it came again to Oberamt Waiblingen, later district Waiblingen.
Oeffingen was 789 first mentioned as "Villa Uffingen im Neckargau". Since this did not import the Reformation, Oeffingen remained Catholic. In 1618 Oeffingen was sold to the Chapter Augsburg and came due to the secularisation of 1803 to the Kingdom of Bavaria. The place was finally annexed in 1810 and assigned to Oberamt Cannstatt. After its dissolution in 1923 it came to Oberamt Waiblingen, later district Waiblingen.

Religions

1534 in Württemberg the Reformation was introduced. The present church of the city is the Lutheran Church, which was built mainly in the 15th century. In addition to the Lutheran Church there is the Pauluskirche (built in 1927) and the Melanchthonkirche (built in 1964) and in the neighborhood Lindle the Johannes-Brenz-Kirche. Also in the district Schmiden the Reformation was introduced by Württemberg. In Oeffingen has only existed since 1970 a separate Protestant church and parish. All Protestants of Fellbach belonged initially to the deanery or church district Cannstatt, today to deanery or church district Waiblingen of the Evangelical-Lutheran Church in Württemberg.
Catholics: After the Reformation, there were no more Catholics. Only in the 19th century Catholics returned and built in 1923 their own church (St. Johannes). 1967, was built a second church, Maria Regina Kirche.
Due to immigration of Catholics was built an own Catholic church (Holy Trinity). Since 1961 Schmiden has its own parish.
Oeffingen was a Catholic enclave in Protestant Württemberg. In Oeffingen was an old Catholic church in the outskirts, which was heavily damaged by an air raid during World War II. The present church of Christus König was built 1968. All three parishes of Fellbach are within the deanery Rems-Murr of the Diocese of Rottenburg-Stuttgart.
The New Apostolic Church was erected in 1983 with 1,400 seats.
In addition to two large churches there are in Fellbach, a Greek Orthodox church and several free churches, among them the United Methodist Church, the Mennonite church and the Seventh-day Adventist Church.

Incorporations
The following municipalities were amalgamated to Fellbach:
 Schmiden (January 1, 1973)
 Oeffingen (April 1, 1974)

Population development
The population figures are estimates, census results (¹) or official updates of the State Statistical Office Baden-Württemberg (only primary residences).
Yearly population figures:

Mayor
At the head of the municipality of Fellbach was a Schultheiß. Since 1930, the official title is Mayor and since the survey to district town on April 1, 1956 Lord Mayor. The position is directly elected by the electorate for a term of eight years. The officeholder is chairman of the municipal council. The general deputies are: first deputy with the official title of Lord Mayor and second deputy with the official title of Mayor.
Community and city leaders since 1800:
1800-1845: Philipp Heinrich Friz, bailiff and clerk
1845-1849: John Sayler, Schultheiss
1850-1877: Jakob Friedrich Lipp, Schultheiss
1878-1908: Ernst Albert Friz, Schultheiss
1908-1931: Friedrich August Brändle, Schultheiss
1932-1937: Max Graser
1938-1945: Emil Adelheim
1945: Alfons Meyer
1945-1948: Heinrich Schnaitmann
1948-1966: Max Graser
1966-1976: Guntram Palm (FDP)
1976-2000: Friedrich-Wilhelm Kiel (FDP)
2000-2016: Christoph Palm (CDU)
since 2016: Gabriele Zull (CDU)

Crest
Current Crest
Blazon : "In Red three pole as silver asked wolfsangel " (only the anchor on which the actual wolfsangel were attached). The city flag is white and red. The coat of arms displays the icon of Fellbach local nobility. It was awarded to the city on March 13, 1956, Baden-Württemberg state government.

Old Coat
Previously led Fellbach to 1933 a coat of arms, which showed the initial F as a milestone mark of the village Fellbach. Then she received a coat of arms with a blue grape as a symbol of viticulture with the silver F before they took 1956 today's crest.

Economy and infrastructure

Viticulture and agriculture
Fellbach was before industrialization mainly a wine-growing town. Today 182 hectares of vineyards are cultivated. In the fields around Fellbach, Schmiden and Oeffingen grain and corn are preferably grown. Great importance had once the greenhouses.

Retail
The commercial life was marked up until the 1990s by the retail trade. With the structural changes here there was a profound change. Many of the long-established retail stores were closed by competitive pressure and a changing consumer behavior.

Commuter
Districts developed mainly to commuters living communities. However, there are now also numerous companies, especially in the metal sector.

Transport
The Bundesstraße 14 (Schwäbisch Hall -Stuttgart) led through the city until 1992, then the 1600m long Kappelberg Tunnel was opened. Moreover, Fellbach is tunneled from a second tunnel, which opened in 1997.(Fellbach City Tunnel).

Fellbach is integrated in the Verkehrs- und Tarifverbund Stuttgart. The city has a stop on the S-Bahn lines S2 (Schorndorf - Stuttgart - Airport - Filderstadt) and S3 (Backnang - Stuttgart Airport). At the Fellbach Lutherkirche is the terminus of the rail line U1 (Fellbach Lutherkirche - Hauptbahnhof - Vaihingen Bf) of the Stuttgarter Straßenbahnen. Furthermore, the urban area runs bus lines 58 ((Summer Rain -) Obere Ziegelei - Schmiden Rathaus), 60 ( Untertürkheim - Luginsland, 207 (Fellbach Alte Kelter -  Fellbach - Schmiden - Oeffingen) 67 (Fellbach Bf Fellbach Altenheim), Waiblingen Bf -Korber Höhe) and 212 (Stetten - Rommelshausen - Fellbach Bf)

Media
In Fellbach (and in Kernen im Remstal) appears as daily newspaper Fellbacher Zeitung. It is nationally identic with the Stuttgarter Nachrichten. 
The Stuttgarter Zeitung appears in Fellbach and Kernen im Remstal also with this self-produced local section.

Public facilities
In Fellbach are the State Office for salaries and benefits of Baden-Württemberg. Fellbach has also a notary.
In the industrial area near the Sommerrain is a building of the Landeskriminalamt Baden-Württemberg.

Education
Fellbach has two gymnasiums, two Realschules, two elementary and secondary schools, four primary schools and a special school (Wichernhaus school). Furthermore, are located in Fellbach one of three schools for mentally and physically disabled of Rems-Murr-district, the Froebel school with kindergarten. There is also a municipal school of music, a youth art school and a youth technic school.
In private ownership are the Helmut-of-Kügelgen School (Waldorf education). The Volkshochschule Unteres Remstal is a collaborative community college of Waiblingen, Fellbach, Weinstadt and Korb.

Things
The Schwabenlandhalle is since 1976 the Culture and Congress Center of Fellbach. It hosts theater performances of tour stages.
Likewise, the "Theater im Polygon" is native in Fellbach, which has its headquarters in Jugendhaus Fellbach. 
Also located in the district Schmiden is the revival house "Orfeo" in the vaulted cellar of the historic "Big House".

City Museum
In Fellbach City Museum, opened in 1977, the city's history is shown. 
The museum is located in a half-timbered building from 1680. Here is also housed the archive Fellbach.

Rotkreuz & TTE Museum
This museum offers to nearly 100 m² a journey through the almost complete series of devices of all radio equipment, which was used after the Second World War until now by the Red Cross, the police, firefighters, emergency services and technical relief.

Cityscape
Fellbach architectural appearance is on the one hand by his past as a wine village marked, on the other by the stormy industrial development since the early 20th century. 

In Old-Fellbach, former wine village at the foot of Kappel Berg, still dominate rural timbered houses from the 16th to the 18th century the big picture. Noteworthy is also the Fellbacher industrial architecture.
By ill modernization in recent decades the historically grown building structures were ever broken, so that Fellbach has no longer a uniform cityscape today. Even the recent urban redevelopment measure are again several half-timbered houses like by demolition victims, including in the area of newly built Fellbacher market and currently in the rear street. In the 1950s, emerged on the outskirts several skyscrapers and numerous interspersed with green areas living quarters in the lower town.
With the eastern ring road, built in 1989, the population threshold was further postponed into Schmidenen field. In contrast, the Western, aligned against Stuttgart suburbs long remained untouched, even to a possible annexation by the state capital counteract. Currently, this is where a large-sized combined indoor and outdoor pool is built.

Freemen
The city Fellbach has conferred the honorary citizenship to the following persons:
1928: August Brändle, Schultheiss
1966: Max Graser, mayor
1991: Guntram Palm, mayor
2000: Friedrich-Wilhelm Kiel, mayor
The former municipality Schmiden has awarded the following persons honorary citizenship:
1958: Theodor Bürkle, farmer, member of council
1962: Gotthilf Bayh, mayor and Member of Landtag

Notable people
Georg Daniel Auberlen (1728–1784), a musician and composer, founder of Fellbach Music School
Nikolaus Ferdinand Auberlen (1755–1828), musician and composer, teacher 
Samuel Gottlob Auberlen (1758–1829), musician and composer
Wilhelm Amandus Auberlen (1798–1874), teacher, musician and composer 
Karl August Auberlen (1824–1864), theologian, professor in Basel, the first son of Wilhelm Amandus Auberlen 
Ferdinand Christian Baur (1792–1860), born in Schmiden, theologian and church historian, founder of the so-called Tübingen School
Karl Ludwig Baur (1794–1838), born in Schmiden, Würrtembergian official
Johann Georg Eppinger (1855–1911), senior teacher in Fellbach, author of the first Fellbach book 
Gerhard Ertl (born 1936), Nobel laureate in 2007 in physics, grew up in Fellbach-Schmiden
Jakob Gauermann (1773–1843), born in Oeffingen, painter, draftsman and engraver
Sami Khedira (born 1987), football player, German national team, (grew up in Oeffingen)
Friedrich Wilhelm Kohler (1754–1811), pastor in Fellbach, introduced in Württemberg the industrial schools in which children and young people learned mechanical skills
Friedrich Luck (1793–1840), priest and composer, as vicar in Fellbach, known by the setting of Joseph von Eichendorff poem 
Eduard Mörike lived in 1873 with his sister in Fellbach. The house where they lived at the time, has since been demolished
John Schnaitmann (1767–1847), pietist, head of the then largest Pietist community in Germany
Friedrich Silcher (1789–1860), composer, lived from 1803 to 1806 in Fellbach
Rosine Weimer (1791–1853), founded in 1841 with the Fellbacher Infants School the first village kindergarten of Württemberg. Her grave is on the old cemetery next to the Lutheran Church 
Karl Friedrich Werner (1804–1872), pastor and author

Literature
Otto Borst : Fellbach. Theiss, Stuttgart 1990, .

Twin towns – sister cities

Fellbach is twinned with:

 Tain-l'Hermitage, France (1964)
 Tournon-sur-Rhône, France (1973)
 Erba, Italy (1978)
 Pécs, Hungary (1986)
 Meissen, Germany (1987)

References

External links
  

Rems-Murr-Kreis
Populated places on the Neckar basin
Populated riverside places in Germany
Municipalities in Baden-Württemberg
Württemberg